The 2016 Parti Québécois leadership election  occurred from October 5 to October 7, 2016 due to the resignation of Parti Québécois leader Pierre Karl Péladeau on May 2, 2016. Jean-François Lisée was elected on the second ballot with 50.63% of the vote.

To be nominated, a candidate paid a $20,000 non-refundable registration fee and submitted signatures of 1,500 party members from the provinces 45 different ridings in Quebec's seven regions by June 30, 2016. The campaign spending limit was $200,000 per candidate.

Timeline
May 2, 2016 - Pierre Karl Péladeau announces his resignation as leader.
May 6, 2016 - Sylvain Gaudreault (Jonquière) is elected interim leader by the party's caucus, defeating Agnès Maltais (Taschereau).
May 7, 2016 - The party's executive council decides that the leadership election will be held between September 15 and October 15, 2016.
May 28–29, 2016 - Leadership election rules and timetable to be finalized at a meeting of riding association presidents in Drummondville, Quebec.
June 30, 2016 - Deadline for candidates to be nominated and to make first deposit of $10,000.
August 30, 2016 - Deadline for second deposit of $10,000.
October 5–7, 2016 - Voting takes place online and by phone using a preferential ballot. 
October 7, 2016 - Results announced at a rally in Quebec City.

Candidates

Alexandre Cloutier
Background

MNA for Lac-Saint-Jean (2007–present), Minister for Canadian Intergovernmental Affairs, the Canadian Francophonie and Sovereignist Governance (2012–2014), second-place finisher in 2015 leadership election.
Date candidacy declared: May 13, 2016
Supporters
Support from caucus members: (14) François Gendron (Abitibi-Ouest), Agnès Maltais (Taschereau), Sylvain Roy (Bonaventure), Harold Lebel (Rimouski), Dave Turcotte (Saint-Jean), Martin Ouellet (René-Lévesque), Sylvain Rochon (Richelieu), Guy Leclair (Beauharnois), Nicole Léger (Pointe-aux-Trembles), Diane Lamarre (Taillon), Maka Kotto (Bourget), Mireille Jean (Chicoutimi), Sylvain Pagé (Labelle), Gaétan Lelièvre (Gaspé)
Support from former caucus members: Stéphane Bédard (Chicoutimi, 1998-2015), former interim leader (2014-2015), Guy Julien (Trois-Rivières), Yves Duhaime (Saint-Maurice), Jean-Pierre Jolivet (Laviolette), Élaine Zakaïb (Richelieu), Serge Geoffrion (La Prairie), Jérôme Proulx (Saint-Jean) 
Other prominent supporters: Bernard Landry (Former Premier of Quebec)
Policies: Does not intend to call a sovereignty referendum until a PQ government's second term, if there is a 'groundswell' of support. Says education is a priority and also supports measures to keep corporate head offices from leaving Quebec. Also supports protecting the French language and entrenching secularism in Quebec's constitution.

Jean-François Lisée
Background

MNA for Rosemont (2012–present), Minister of International Relations, La Francophonie and External Trade (2012–2014), former journalist and professor. Ran in 2015 leadership election but withdrew. 
Date candidacy declared: May 16, 2016
Supporters
Support from caucus members: (5) Carole Poirier (Hochelaga-Maisonneuve), Alain Therrien (Sanguinet), Mathieu Traversy (Terrebonne), André Villeneuve (Berthier), Pascal Bérubé (Matane-Matapédia)
Support from former caucus members:  
Other prominent supporters:  
Policies: Opposes holding a referendum in a PQ government's first mandate and opposes any government initiatives or public spending to lay the groundwork for sovereignty until a PQ government wins its second mandate. Supports the proposed Quebec Charter of Values and  has called for a ban on wearing the niqab and burka in public.

Martine Ouellet 
Background

MNA for Vachon (2010–present), Minister of Natural Resources and Wildlife (2012–2014), third-place finisher in 2015 leadership election. Worked at Hydro-Québec for 20 years as a mechanical engineer prior to entering politics.
Date candidacy declared: May 27, 2016
Supporters
Support from caucus members:  
Support from former caucus members: Robert Dean (Prévost), Gilbert Paquette (Rosemont)
Other prominent supporters: Mario Beaulieu, MP for La Pointe-de-l'Île and president of the Bloc Québécois, Xavier Barsalou-Duval, MP for Pierre-Boucher—Les Patriotes—Verchères, Michel Boudrias, MP for Terrebonne, Marilène Gill, MP for Manicouagan
Policies: Promises to hold a referendum on Quebec sovereignty in a first mandate

Paul St-Pierre Plamondon 
Background
39-year-old lawyer, political columnist, essayist and commentator who has never held a seat in the Quebec National Assembly.
Date candidacy declared: June 3, 2016
Supporters
Support from caucus members:  
Support from former caucus members:  
Other prominent supporters:  
Policies: Wishes to revive social democracy and opposes austerity. Opposes holding a referendum on sovereignty during a PQ government's first mandate and would hold public consultations during a second mandate to gauge whether or not the public is interested. Opposes the Quebec Charter of Values proposed by the former PQ government in 2014.

Withdrawn candidate

Véronique Hivon
Background
MNA for Joliette (2008–present), Minister of Social Services and Youth Protection, Minister of the Lanaudière region and Minister responsible for the Die in Dignity commission (2012–2014). 
Date candidacy declared: May 9, 2016
Date candidacy withdrawn: August 26, 2016
Supporters
Support from caucus members: (5) Mathieu Traversy (Terrebonne), Claude Cousineau  (Bertrand), André Villeneuve (Berthier),  Carole Poirier (Hochelaga-Maisonneuve), Sylvain Pagé (Labelle)
Support from former caucus members: (8) Marie Bouillé (Iberville), Gilles Chapadeau (Rouyn-Noranda–Témiscamingue), Linda Goupil (Lévis) former Justice minister, Élizabeth Larouche (Abitibi-Est) former Aboriginal Affairs minister, Scott McKay (Repentigny), Serge Ménard (Laval-des-Rapides) former Public Security minister, Lucie Papineau (Prévost) former Industry and Commerce minister, Cécile Vermette (Marie-Victorin)
Other prominent supporters:  Claude DeBellefeuille, former Bloc Québécois MP (Beauharnois—Salaberry), Gabrielle Lemieux, Advisor on the national executive of the PQ, Paul Crête, Vice-President on the national executive of the PQ, Gabriel Ste-Marie, Bloc Québécois MP (Joliette)
Policies: Supports electoral reform and more free votes in the Quebec National Assembly.

Declined
Jean-Martin Aussant, MNA for Nicolet-Yamaska (2008–2012) as member for the PQ from 2008  until 2011 when he resigned, criticising then leader Pauline Marois for downplaying Quebec sovereignty. Leader of the Option nationale political party (2011–2013), currently executive director of Chantier de l’économie sociale. 
Pierre Céré, spokesperson for the Conseil national des chômeurs, PQ activist and 2014 candidate in Laurier-Dorion.
Bernard Drainville, MNA for Marie-Victorin (2007–2016), Minister responsible for Democratic Institutions and Active Citizenship (2012–2014) and the main architect and defender of the Quebec Charter of Values.
Nicolas Marceau, MNA for Rousseau (2009–present), Minister of Finance (2012–2014).

Results
First round:
Jean-François Lisée: 25,936 (47.03%)
Alexandre Cloutier: 16,357 (29.66%)
Martine Ouellet: 9,077 (16.46%)
Paul St-Pierre Plamondon: 3,772 (6.84%)

Second round:

Jean-François Lisée: 27,801 (50.63%)
Alexandre Cloutier: 17,403  (31.70%)
Martine Ouellet: 9,702 (17.67%)
Total votes: 55,142
Turnout: 75.09 per cent

Source:

Opinion polling

Parti Québécois supporters

All Quebecers

See also
Parti Québécois leadership elections

References

2016
2016 elections in Canada
Parti Québécois leadership election